Merelava (or Mere Lava) is an island in the Banks Islands of the Torba Province of northern Vanuatu.

Names
The inhabitants of Merelava call their own island Mwerlap, more accurately N̄wërlap .

The name Merelava or M̄ere Lava reflects the way it is called in the neighbouring Mota language ‒ phonetically . According to Codrington, the etymology of this name (in Proto-Torres-Banks) is likely to be *mʷera lava, literally “the big boy”; it contrasts with the neighbouring island M̄erig , from *mʷera riɣi “the small boy”. These words refer metaphorically to the islands themselves.

Geography
Merelava is situated in the southeastern part of the archipelago near Mota and Merig. Merelava has also been known as Star Island.

Merelava is a nearly round volcanic island with a diameter of almost 4.5 km and an area of 18 km2. It is formed by a basaltic stratovolcano, which reaches in Mount Teu, also called Star Peak, a height of 883 m above the sea level.

The main village is Tesmet on the west coast of the island. Other villages, starting clockwise at Tesmet, are Levetmise (northwest), Lekweal (north), Lewetneak (northeast), and Aot (southeast, second largest).

History
Merelava was first sighted by Europeans during the Spanish expedition of Pedro Fernández de Quirós, from 25 to 29 April 1606. The island's name was then charted as San Marcos.

Merelava was reportedly seen smoking when it was first encountered by Quirós.

Population and language
The island has about 650 inhabitants. They all speak an Oceanic language known as Mwerlap.

References

Bibliography

External links
 Linguistic map of north Vanuatu, showing location of Merelava.

Islands of Vanuatu
Volcanoes of Vanuatu
Torba Province